Ladice or Ladice of Cyrene (Greek: Λαδική, fl. 548 BC to 526 BC) was a Greek Cyrenaean princess and was a member of the Battiad dynasty. She married the ancient Egyptian pharaoh Amasis II. When Amasis died in 526 BC, she returned from Egypt back to Cyrene.

Family 
Ladice was the daughter of the fifth Greek Cyrenaean king Battus III and Greek Cyrenaean queen Pheretima. Her brother would be the future sixth Greek Cyrenaean king Arcesilaus III. Although her maternal grandparents are unknown, her paternal grandparents were the fourth Greek Cyrenaean king Arcesilaus II and Greek Cyrenaean queen Eryxo. Although her father is considered to have been Battus III, Herodotus suggests that from other accounts her father could have been Arcesilaus II or Critobulus, one of the leading Greek Cyrenaean citizens. She was born and raised in Cyrene.

Marriage
After 548 BC, she married pharaoh Amasis II as his fourth wife. 

Before Ladice's marriage with Amasis took place, her father made an alliance with the pharaoh to protect Cyrenaica from the local Libyan population and its aristocracy. Amasis, as a token of his goodwill and friendship with Battus, wanted to marry a Greek woman from Cyrenaica and Battus allowed him to select any woman whom he wanted to marry. Amasis chose Battus' daughter Ladice. Ladice and Amasis married in Cyrene. 

When Ladice married Amasis, she became a member of the Twenty-sixth Dynasty of Egypt. Ladice is not well known in ancient Egyptian history and her name has not been found on any monuments from the time. Nor is she mentioned on any Egyptian inscriptions from the period. However, her marriage to Amasis encouraged cultural and trade interactions between Egypt and its neighbours in the Mediterranean.

According to Herodotus, it was said that when Amasis and Ladice returned to his palace in Sais, Egypt, their marriage, for a while, was not consummated. Every time Amasis went to bed with Ladice, he was unable to have intercourse with her, although he did with his other wives. Amasis thought that Ladice might have bewitched him and formally accused Ladice. If she was found guilty, the punishment would have been the death penalty. She denied the charge, but to no effect. So Ladice made a silent prayer to the Greek goddess of love Aphrodite. If Aphrodite could save her life and her marriage, she would dedicate a statue to her in Cyrene. The goddess answered her prayer and her marriage was consummated and the pharaoh fell deeply in love with her. Amasis withdrew his accusation against Ladice. Ladice ordered a statue to be made in the image of Aphrodite and she sent the statue to Cyrene, where it was placed looking outward from the city. The statue was still there in the time of Herodotus.

Stepsons 
It is unknown whether Ladice and Amasis had any children. However, through her marriage to the pharaoh, Ladice had two stepsons as Amasis had two sons, a child each from his first and third wives. These sons were prince Amose and his younger half brother, the son of queen Tentkheta, who later became the last pharaoh of the dynasty, Psamtik III.

Return to Cyrene
When Amasis died in 526 BC, Psamtik III became pharaoh and ruled until 525 BC, when king Cambyses II of Persia conquered Egypt. When Cambyses discovered who Ladice was, he sent her safely from Egypt back to Cyrene. After her return to Cyrene, no more is known about Ladice.

See also
 List of Kings of Cyrene

Sources

Morkot, R., The Penguin Historical Atlas of Ancient Greece, Penguin Books, The Bath Press - Avon, Great Britain, 1996
Herodotus, The Histories, Book 4
https://web.archive.org/web/20081231121921/https://www.livius.org/ct-cz/cyrenaica/cyrenaica.html
https://www.livius.org/am-ao/amasis/amasis.html
http://www.reshafim.org.il/ad/egypt/history21-31.htm

6th-century BC Greek people
6th-century BC Greek women
Cyrenean Greeks
Queens consort of the Twenty-sixth Dynasty of Egypt